The Levi Anderson House is a historic house in Union Township, Ross County, Ohio, United States.  Located along Anderson Station Road west of the city of Chillicothe, it is a fine example of the Greek Revival farmhouses of early nineteenth-century rural Ross County.

The oldest (rear) part of the house was built in 1826; its first resident appears to have been William Robinson (1764 - 1834), who participated in the first settlement of Ross County in 1795. William was a participant of the last deadly conflict between whites and Native Americans in Ross County while surveying the Indian homeland under the current treaty for future white development with the hope that the Natives would give up their land. The survey party was caught attempting to steal the Natives' horses and the ensuing battle killed William's half-brother Joshua (1769 - 1795) and some of the natives but resulted in the successful theft of all of the Natives' property. (ref. The property was purchased by Levi Anderson (1790 - 1846) in 1838, who arranged for the expansion of the house and the embellishment of its interior. Responsible for the interior improvements was Levi's brother Gershon Anderson (1780 - 1842); he crafted detailed woodworking, which remains to the present day.

The house itself is a brick structure, covered with weatherboarding; it rests on a foundation of sandstone and is ornamented by elements of wood and stone.  Many original elements of the house survive, qualifying it for inclusion on the National Register of Historic Places because of its well-preserved historic architecture.  It was added to the Register in late 1976, both because of its architecture and because of its place in local exploration and settlement.

References

Houses completed in 1826
Greek Revival houses in Ohio
Houses on the National Register of Historic Places in Ohio
Houses in Ross County, Ohio
National Register of Historic Places in Ross County, Ohio
1826 establishments in Ohio